Myint Maung is a Burmese politician who is currently serving as Chief Minister of Taninthayi Region and Taninthayi Region Parliament MP for Kawthaung Township  Constituency No. 2.

He previously served as the Minister of Natural Resource and Environment for Taninthayi Region from 2016 to 2019. Myint Maung is also the NLD secretary for Tanintharyi Region. He was appointed as acting Chief Minister for Tanintharyi Region on 11 March 2019 after former chief minister Lei Lei Maw was arrested on charges of corruption. On 10 February 2021, in the aftermath of the 2021 Myanmar coup d'état, Myint Maung was arrested and detained during a late-night raid of his residence.

References 

Living people
National League for Democracy politicians
Government ministers of Myanmar
Region or state chief ministers of Myanmar
Year of birth missing (living people)